The Campbell Brothers are an American Sacred Steel gospel group from Rush, New York composed of three brothers and one son.

The ensemble features prominent pedal steel guitar and began as the house band for a House of God Keith Dominion congregation. The pedal steel player, Chuck, uses his own tuning schema. The lap steel guitar was played by Chuck's brother, Darick Campbell.  They released several albums on blues label Arhoolie Records in the late 1990s and early 2000s before signing with Ropeadope Records, releasing Can You Feel It? in 2005. The album reached No. 26 on the Billboard Top Gospel Albums chart. The group often features guest vocalists, including Denise Brown, Katie Jackson, and Malcolm Kirby.

Members
Chuck Campbell - pedal steel guitar
Phillip Campbell - electric guitar, bass
Carlton Campbell - drums
Darick Campbell (1966-May 2020) - lap steel

Discography
Pass Me Not (Arhoolie Records, 1997)
Sacred Steel On Tour! (Arhoolie, 2001)
Sacred Steel for the Holidays (Arhoolie, 2001)
Can You Feel It? (Ropeadope Records, 2005)
Beyond The 4 Walls (APO Records, 2013)

References

American gospel musical groups
Musical groups from New York (state)
Ropeadope Records artists
People from Rush, New York
Arhoolie Records artists